ICE S is Deutsche Bahn's train for high-speed tests. The letter "S" abbreviates the German expression Schnellfahrt, which translates into high speed run. The train replaced the InterCityExperimental (ICE V).

History 
The train was originally used to test components during the development of the ICE 3 in the mid-1990s. The powerheads were taken from the ongoing production of the ICE 2 with only minor modifications. When testing was completed, both these powered carriages were retired.

After the ICE V was retired, the ICE S became the testing train for the maintenance of the high-speed lines. Three times a year, the train runs on each line with an array of sensors and cameras to determine the line's condition. During the acceptance tests of new high-speed lines, the ICE S is usually the first train to drive the line at the design speed and beyond.

Facts and Future
This train was originally built for testing the technical concepts of the ICE 3, and operated with three intermediate cars forming a "half ICE 3" (transformer car and two cars with traction motors). Now most operate with only one intermediate car for different testing purposes.

The train consists of two motor units (derived from the ICE 2) and three coaches with test equipment. The main visible differences to normal ICE 2 trainsets are the special design and the three pantographs of the coaches.

References

External links 

 ICE-S Versuchs- und Erprobungszug von Siemens Adtranz und DB AG (fan site)

Electric multiple units of Germany
Electric multiple units with locomotive-like power cars
Intercity Express
Experimental and prototype high-speed trains
Track recording trains